James Ellis (2 October 1829 – 1901)  was a British Liberal Party politician who sat in the House of Commons from 1885 to 1892.

Early life
Ellis was born in Glenfield, Leicestershire, the son of Joseph Ellis and his wife Hannah Shipley, daughter of John Shipley. He was educated at the schools of the Society of Friends (Quakers). He was a merchant and owner of granite quarries. He was chairman of Leicester School Board.

Political career
By 1881 Ellis had been elected as Chairman of South Leicestershire Liberal Association He was Liberal candidate for Bosworth at the 1885 general election and was returned as Member of Parliament. On 25 June 1888 he announced he would be standing down at the next election at a meeting of the Bosworth Divisional Liberal Association in Hinckley Ellis was described as a Gladstonian Liberal by inclination. He continued held the seat until the 1892 election.

Family
Ellis married in 1855 Louisa Burgess daughter of Thomas Burgess of Wigston Grange, Leicestershire.

References

External links

1829 births
1901 deaths
Liberal Party (UK) MPs for English constituencies
UK MPs 1885–1886
UK MPs 1886–1892
People from Glenfield, Leicestershire